Water from an Ancient Well is a jazz album by South African pianist Abdullah Ibrahim that was first released in 1986.

The album was also included in the book 1001 Albums You Must Hear Before You Die.

Track listing
All tracks written by Ibrahim

 "Mandela" - 4:58
 "Song for Sathima" - 6:10
 "Mannenberg Revisited (Cape Town Fringe)" - 6:09
 "Tuang Guru" - 5:24
 "Water from an Ancient Well" - 11:55
 "The Wedding" - 2:38
 "The Mountain" - 3:19
 "Sameeda" - 5:56

Personnel
 Abdullah Ibrahim – piano
 Carlos Ward – alto flute
 Ricky Ford – tenor sax
 Charles Davis – baritone sax
 David Williams – bass
 Ben Riley – drums
 Dick Griffin – trombone

References

External links 

Water from an Ancient Well (Adobe Flash) at Radio3Net (streamed copy where licensed)

1986 albums
Abdullah Ibrahim albums
Albums recorded at Van Gelder Studio